The Pan American Petroleum and Transport Company (PAT) was an oil company founded in 1916 by the American oil tycoon Edward L. Doheny after he had made a huge oil strike in Mexico. Pan American profited from fuel demand during World War I, and from the subsequent growth in use of automobiles. For several years Pan American was the largest American oil company, with holdings in the United States, Mexico, Colombia and Venezuela. In 1924 Pan American was involved in the Teapot Dome scandal over irregularities in the award of a U.S. government oil concession. Standard Oil of Indiana obtained a majority stake in 1925. The company sold its foreign properties to Standard Oil of New Jersey in 1932. What was left of Pan American was merged with Standard Oil of Indiana in 1954 to form Amoco.

Origins

Edward L. Doheny was a prospector who became wealthy  in the 1880s from silver mines in the Black Range of New Mexico.
In 1892 he moved with his family to Los Angeles, where he sank a mine and found oil at the corner of Patton Street and West State Street.
This began an oil boom in Los Angeles. Doheny overextended himself and his company went bankrupt in August 1896.
The setback was temporary, and a long-term contract with the Atchison, Topeka and Santa Fe Railway gave him the opportunity to develop and expand a growing number of oil properties.
In 1900 he visited Mexico with his associate Charles A. Canfield and Almon Porter Maginnis of the Santa Fe railroad, 
saw the oil potential of the country near Tampico, Tamaulipas and began acquiring property.

Doheny found heavy oil in El Ebano in 1901, which he exported to the United States for use in paving.
He formed the Mexican Petroleum Company and funded it with $6 million of his own money.
In 1905 he bought properties near Tuxpan, Veracruz, and formed the Huasteca Petroleum company to hold them.
In 1910 his wells in the Juan Casiano Basin in the Faja de Oro field started to produce good quality oil. 
The gusher at Casiano number 7 spewed out 60,000 barrels a day, and by 1918 had delivered over 85 million barrels of oil.
In 1911 Doheny signed a contract to supply Standard Oil.
Doheny's Mexican Petroleum Company made a major strike in February 1916 with the Cerro Azul No. 4 well in Cerro Azul, Veracruz, Mexico.
When the well struck it shot a stream of oil  into the air. It became world's largest, pumping 260,000 barrels per day. Over the next fourteen years the well produced over 57 million barrels.

Expansion

The Pan American Petroleum and Transport Company was incorporated by Doheny in Delaware in 1916 as the holding company for his Mexican Petroleum Company, Huasteca Petroleum Company and California oil properties.
World War I drove up demand for oil-fueled transport, and Doheny responded by expanding pumps, tanks and loading sites in Tampico. By July 1917 Pan American had a fleet of 31 tankers. The company paid $1.1 million in dividends in 1917 and $3.1 million in dividends on its common stock in 1918.
1918 revenues were $17 million and net profits were almost $7 million.

In 1918 the Carib Syndicate, a concern owned by Americans, bought the Barco oil concession in Colombia.
They sold 75% of their interest to the Colombian Petroleum Company the next year, a subsidiary of Pan American.
Doheny was also interested in plans to develop the oil industry in Venezuela, and in building a pipeline from Colombia to Venezuela to make it more economical to export the Barco oil production from the west coast of Lake Maracaibo.
In 1921 Pan American was the largest oil company in the United States, ahead of Sinclair Consolidated Oil Corporation and the Standard Oil Company of Indiana. Automobile production was booming and oil prices were high.
The Mexican Petroleum Company was the largest in Mexico, and Mexico was the largest oil producer in the world.

In 1922 Albert B. Fall, U.S. Secretary of the Interior, leased the oil field at Elk Hills, California, to the Pan American Petroleum & Transport Company.
Around the same time, the Teapot Dome Field in Wyoming was leased to Sinclair Consolidated Oil Corporation.
Both oilfields were part of the US Navy's petroleum reserves. Neither lease was subject to competitive bidding. 
In 1924 rumors about corruption in the deals escalated into the Teapot Dome scandal.

On 24 January 1924 Doheny testified before the U.S. Senate Committee on Public Lands and Surveys, and admitted that he had loaned Fall $100,000 in cash with no security some months before the oilfield leasing arrangement was made. Doheny said the loan was a personal one.
Pan American had been the lowest bidder for a contract to build and fill crude oil storage facilities at Pearl Harbor, 
and had offered to undertake this contract in exchange for the oilfield lease, 
being paid in oil and then paying royalties to the government for oil extracted in excess of costs.
Eventually the Supreme Court nullified both leases.
It was not until 1930 that Doheny was cleared of all charges.

In 1923 Louis Blaustein and his son Jacob Blaustein sold a half interest in their American Oil Company to Pan American in exchange for a guaranteed supply of oil. 
Before this deal, American Oil had depended on Standard Oil of New Jersey, a competitor, for its supplies.
At the end of 1923 Pan American had a net worth of $173 million, with net earnings that year of over $20 million.
The company paid dividends of $20.4 million that year.

Amoco subsidiary

On 1 April 1925 the California assets of Pan American Petroleum and Transport were transferred to a new holding company, the Pan American Western Petroleum Company, 
in which Doheny retained control. He sold a majority of shares in the remainder of the Venezuelan facilities of the Pan American Petroleum and Transport Company and his Mexican Petroleum Company to Pan American Eastern Petroleum, a new subsidiary of Standard Oil of Indiana.
This included the Mexican holdings, Atlantic and Gulf Coasts holdings in the United States, refineries, pipelines and 31 tankers.

At the end of 1925 Pan American Western gained control of Lago Petroleum Corporation from C. Ledyard Blair's Blair & Co..
The transaction was to be the subject of a stockholder action in 1933, alleging that there had been a conspiracy by the bankers, who were represented on the Pan American board, to make excessive profits.
In 1926 Venezuelan Eastern Petroleum Corporation was organized as a subsidiary of Pan American Eastern with the purpose of buying and developing Venezuelan oil properties.

The Turkish Petroleum Company discovered a large oil field in Iraq in 1928.  France, the United Kingdom, and the United States were each worried about being edged out by the other two. The Red Line Agreement gave the Near East Development Corporation, the Anglo-Persian Oil Company, Royal Dutch Shell, and the Compagnie Française des Pétroles each 23.75% of any oil that was produced by the Turkish Petroleum Company.
The Near East Development Corporation (NEDC) represented American interests and included Jersey Standard Oil, Socony-Vacuum Oil Company, Gulf Oil, the Pan-American Petroleum and Transport Company, and Atlantic Refining. The remaining 5% share went to an Armenian businessman, Calouste Gulbenkian, who had previously owned shares within TPC.
Pan American sold out its shares in NEDC to Jersey Standard and Socony (later Mobil) in 1930.

In 1932 Pan American sold its foreign properties to Standard Oil of New Jersey for about $100 million. 
With this acquisition, Standard Oil of New Jersey became Mexico's largest oil producer.
The deal also included large oil concessions in Venezuela and Pan-American's UK subsidiary Cleveland Petroleum Products.
However, a few years later the Mexican properties were nationalized.
President Lázaro Cárdenas expropriated all foreign oil concessions on 18 March 1938 and placed them under the government-controlled Pemex, paying compensation to the former owners.

In the 1940s the case of Blaustein v. Pan American Petroleum & Oil Transport Co. was heard by the Supreme Court to determine whether the directors of Pan American had been in breach of their fiduciary duty.
The directors were all officers of directors of Standard Oil of Indiana, which held almost 80% of Pan American's shares, and it was charged that they had deprived Pan American of profitable opportunities to drill and refine oil.
The majority finding, setting an important precedent, was that it should be assumed that they had acted in good faith and without personal gains to themselves.

In 1954 Pan American merged with Standard of Indiana to form the American Oil Company, Amoco.
Amoco was in turn acquired by British Petroleum in 1998.

In popular culture

The novel Oil! by Upton Sinclair published in 1927 is loosely based on Doheney's life and the story of Pan American.
Oil! was in turn the inspiration for the 2007 film There Will Be Blood.

A photo by Walker Evans in Let Us Now Praise Famous Men of a post office in Sprott, AL shows a Pan-Am pump.

References

Citations

Sources

Defunct oil companies of the United States
Non-renewable resource companies established in 1916
Non-renewable resource companies disestablished in 1954